Monika Linkytė (born 3 June 1992) is a Lithuanian singer and songwriter. She represented Lithuania in the Eurovision Song Contest 2015 along with Vaidas Baumila with the song "This Time", placing 18th. She also represented Lithuania in the New Wave 2014 competition and was a finalist on season two of Lietuvos Balsas. She will represent Lithuania again in the Eurovision Song Contest 2023 with the song "Stay".

Linkytė has previously attempted to represent Lithuania in the Eurovision Song Contest in 2010, 2011, 2012, 2013, 2014 and in the Junior Eurovision Song Contest in 2007.

Early life and education
Linkytė was born on 3 June 1992 in Gargždai. After completing gymnasium, she moved to Vilnius to attend Vilnius University, studying public health, but left after three semesters. In 2014, she began studying law at Vilnius University, but in 2016 left to study music education at the British and Irish Modern Music Institute in London.

Career
In 2007, Linkytė competed in the Lithuanian national selection for the Junior Eurovision Song Contest 2007 when she was 15 years old. She later returned to Eurovision in 2010 when she competed in Eurovizija 2010 with the song "Give Away". She qualified from the first semi-final and placed tenth in the final. Subsequently, she competed in Eurovizija 2011 and 2012, placing fourth and third in the finals with the songs "Days Go By" and "Happy", respectively. She went on to place second on the second season of Lietuvos Balsas, the Lithuanian version of The Voice.

After the Eurovizija national final was scrapped in favor of Eurovizijos Atranka 2013, Linkytė continued to take part, competing with the song "Baby Boy", written by Sasha Son. She was forced to withdraw from the competition following the second semi-final due to contracting laryngitis. The next year, she competed in Eurovizijos Atranka 2014 and placed fourth. Afterwards, she represented Lithuania in the New Wave 2014 competition, placing fourth. The following year, she competed in Eurovizijos Atranka 2015 and also submitted the self-penned song "Skęstu" to the competition. While the song was eliminated during the sixth show, she went on to win the competition performing the song "This Time" with Vaidas Baumila. Linkytė and Baumila went on to represent Lithuania in the Eurovision Song Contest 2015 in Vienna, where they qualified from the second semi-final in seventh place, and went on to place 18th in the final.

After Eurovision, Linkytė released the single "Po dangum", which went on to be certified platinum in Lithuania. Her debut studio album Walk with Me was released on 17 September 2015, and was also certified platinum. She went on to win Best Album for Walk with Me, Best Song for "Po dangum", and Best Female Act at the 2015 M.A.M.A. Awards, the largest music awards ceremony in Lithuania. She was nominated for Best Female Act once again at the 2016 awards.

Discography

Studio albums

Extended plays
 Old Love (2018)

Singles

Awards and nominations

References

External links
 

1992 births
English-language singers from Lithuania
Eurovision Song Contest entrants of 2015
Eurovision Song Contest entrants of 2023
Eurovision Song Contest entrants for Lithuania
21st-century Lithuanian women singers
Lithuanian pop singers
Living people
People from Gargždai
Samogitian people
Vilnius University alumni